The Franklin Delano Roosevelt Foundation is a private 501(c)3 US public charity based at Adams House, Harvard University.  Founded as the FDR Suite Foundation in 2008, its original goal was to restore the Harvard rooms of Franklin Roosevelt, the 32nd President of the United States. The Foundation adopted its current name in 2014 to better reflect its broadened philanthropic mission to promote and preserve the legacy of Franklin Roosevelt throughout the world. The Foundation currently comprises three principal initiatives:

The Franklin Delano Roosevelt Suite & Historical Collections
The centerpiece and spiritual home of the Foundation is the FDR Suite at Adams House, Harvard University, the 1904 Westmorly Court rooms of “Frank” Roosevelt and his roommate Lathrop “Jake” Brown. There, the Foundation maintains a living museum to the 32nd president of the United States. After a complete renovation that required six years and $300,000, the restored rooms, which contain almost 2000 period objects, shed new light on the early life of one of America’s most important president and form one of the most detailed and illustrative collections of Gilded Age university life anywhere in the world.

The FDR Global Citizenship Program
The Global Citizenship program exposes Harvard undergraduates to the globalized structures that underpin 21st-century business, politics, communications and science; with strong emphases on health, ideology and the environment. Student programming includes conferences and seminars throughout the academic year that allow undergraduates to engage directly with noted experts from government, science, development, medicine and diplomacy. The program also sponsors the FDR Global Fellowship, which annually sends 2-4 talented undergraduates – who could not otherwise afford to spend a summer in academic pursuits – abroad for extensive training and research in the humanities and natural sciences.

The FDR Center for Global Engagement
Begun in 2013 as an expansion of the Foundation's educational mission, the Center is guided by one of the core tenets of Franklin Roosevelt’s philosophy: “it is common sense to take a method and try it. If it fails, admit it frankly and try another. But above all, try something.”

A non-partisan think-tank, the Center is committed to finding practical, reasonable, implementable solutions to specific problems confounding the 21st century. The Center supports research for broad publication, conducts consultative projects for real-world clients, and hosts fellows from beyond the gates of Harvard. The Center's director is Jed Willard '96.

The Foundation's current executive director is Michael Weishan

Primary sources

Roosevelt, Franklin D.; Roosevelt, Elliot, ed. FDR: His Personal Letters (4 vol., 1947); volume one covers Roosevelt's years at Groton and Harvard; pg 371 gives a physical description of the Suite, and includes Roosevelt's own drawing of the floor plan; subsequent letters describe the rooms' decor and furnishing.

Architectural references

 Bainbridge Bunting, Margaret Henderson Floyd, Harvard: An Architectural History, Harvard University Press, 1985.
 Shand-Tucci, Douglass, Harvard University: An Architectural Tour, Princeton Architectural Press, 2001

Biographies of FDR with details of the FDR Suite

Freidel, Frank. Franklin D. Roosevelt: A Rendezvous with Destiny (1990), One-volume scholarly biography; covers entire life
Freidel, Frank. Franklin D. Roosevelt (4 vol 1952–73), the most detailed scholarly biography; ends in 1934.
Smith, Jean Edward FDR 2007 
Ward, Geoffrey C. Before The Trumpet: Young Franklin Roosevelt, 1882–1905 details of FDR's Harvard Years
Weishan, Michael  FDR: A Life in Pictures

External links
 The Franklin Delano Roosevelt Foundation site
 Adams House official site
 The FDR Suite at Adams House, Harvard University
 http://www.fdrlibrary.marist.edu/  FDR Presidential Library and Museum

 

Harvard University
Warren and Wetmore buildings